Bubalus grovesi is an extinct species of water buffalo that lived in southern Sulawesi during the Late Pleistocene and Early Holocene.

B. grovesi was an extremely small buffalo species, estimated at only . It experienced a body size reduction of about 90% from the typical water buffalo. The closest relatives of B. grovesi are the living anoa, which still inhabit Sulawesi today.

References

Pleistocene even-toed ungulates
Pleistocene mammals of Asia
Holocene extinctions
Extinct animals of Indonesia